The Unipiper (born Brian Kidd; 29 April 1983) is a Portland, Oregon unicyclist, street performer, bagpiper and internet celebrity.

Life and career
Brian Kidd moved to Portland, Oregon, from North Carolina in 2007. The Oregonian newspaper wrote in 2017 that he came up with the act that he would later name the Unipiper "shortly before he moved to Portland", but developed it in Portland, where he was influenced by the city's receptiveness to quirky characters. He named his character the Unipiper when he moved to Portland.

The Unipiper is an American performance artist whose work regularly combines unicycling with playing the (sometimes flaming) bagpipes.  The Unipiper first found Internet fame in 2011 when a video of him performing The Imperial March went viral. The video featured The Unipiper wearing a Darth Vader mask, while riding a unicycle and playing the bagpipes, and was subsequently featured on The Tonight Show with Jay Leno.  His other mainstream media appearances have included America's Got Talent and Jimmy Kimmel Live!.  He has since branched out into performances referencing non-Star Wars fictional elements, including Game of Thrones, Batman v Superman: Dawn of Justice, and Pokémon.  His antics as Uncle Sam have attracted international attention.

In 2019, The Unipiper helped organize Weird Portland United, a non-profit dedicated to promoting artists and creatives in the Portland metropolitan area.

See also

Keep Portland Weird

References

External links 

1983 births
Living people
American bagpipe players
Artists from Portland, Oregon
Culture of Portland, Oregon
Musicians from Portland, Oregon
People from Colonial Heights, Virginia
Star Wars fandom
Unicyclists